"" (sometimes written "") is the national anthem of Malawi. It was written and composed by Michael-Fredrick Paul Sauka and adopted in 1964 as a result of a competition.

History 
In the lead up to independence in 1964, a competition to find a national anthem was held. Entries were received from Europe, the US and many African countries. Malawian Michael-Fredrick Paul Sauka submitted four entries to the competition. Sauka was a member of the Nyasaland Audit Department and a part-time music teacher at St. Mary's Girl's Secondary School in Zomba. He was also the organist of Zomba's Roman Catholic church. One of his entries was chosen as the winner and adopted as the national anthem.

Lyrics

Notes

References

External links
'Oh God Bless our Land of Malawi' MIDI

Malawian culture
African anthems
Malawian music
National symbols of Malawi
1964 songs
National anthem compositions in F major